Sobha Topaz is a super luxury residential skyscraper situated in Sobha City in Thrissur city of Kerala State. It is the tallest residential skyscraper in Thrissur city (97.90 metres with Helipad) and the third tallest residential building in Kerala State. (after Choice Paradise, in Kochi and Nikunjam iPark, in Trivandrum). The building consists of 216 luxury apartments in 27 storeys. It also boosts a helipad in the top of the building. The project is developed by Sobha Developers Ltd. The project is chosen by the jury of Construction Week India Awards 2012 as the runner up for the "High-Rise Project of the Year".

References

Buildings and structures in Thrissur
Residential buildings completed in 2012